A learning resource center (LRC) is a facility within a school, staffed by a specialist, containing several information sources to facilitate education for students and staff. It differs from a regular school library in its additional focus on multimedia resources and information technology.

History
LRCs are based on educational trends established in the mid 1960's and 1970's, which focus on methods of self-learning, programmed learning and learning for mastery and learning throughout audio media, including the earliest beginnings of computer usage within learning processes. Information technology and teaching and learning theories have since added a new dimension to LRCs, which are growing in need, particularly since the COVID-19 pandemic, which has forced educational institutions to rely on online resources more than ever before.

References
Edwards, Brian. Libraries and Learning Resource Centres. Oxford, UK: Architectural Press, 2009.
Alomran, Hamad Ibrahim; (2007) Learning Resource Centres in Saudi Arabia: A study to the Reality with A plan for an Ideal center. Riyadh: Riyadh Girls University
Burlingame, Dwight, Dennis C. Fields, and Anthony C. Schulzetenberg. The College Learning Resource Center. Littleton, Colo: Libraries Unlimited, 1978.
Thomson, Sarah Katharine. Learning Resource Centers in Community Colleges: A Survey of Budgets and Services. Chicago: American Library Association, 1975.
Crawford, L. Lucille. The Learning Resource Center—Its Development and Implementation. [Columbus, Ohio]: Ohio Association of Supervision and Curriculum Development, 1970.
Pearson, Neville P., and Lucius A. Butler. Learning Resource Centers; Selected Readings. Minneapolis: Burgess Pub. Co, 1973.
E.N OSARONWI(2013)solve the problem of resource center

Learning